USS Marlin (SS-205), a Mackerel-class submarine, was the first ship of the United States Navy to be named for the marlin, a large game fish. Marlin and her near-sister Mackerel (designed and built by the Electric Boat Company) were prototype small submarines, which the Navy was exploring to replace the aging S-class submarines. References differ as to whether Marlin had a direct drive propulsion system or diesel-electric drive.

Her keel was laid down by Portsmouth Navy Yard in Kittery, Maine, on 23 May 1940. She was launched on 29 January 1941 sponsored by Mrs. John D. Wainwright, and commissioned on 1 August 1941.

After service in the Atlantic Fleet out of Submarine Base New London, Connecticut, for half a year, Marlin departed New London 21 March 1942 for Casco Bay, Maine. She arrived the next day for duty with TG 27.1, training new escort vessels in antisubmarine warfare. She returned to New London 18 April, and operated in Long Island Sound through 1942.

On 7 January 1943 the submarine arrived in Casco Bay for further duty with TG 27.1 until 16 January. She then spent the next 2½ years patrolling and training ships off New London and Portsmouth, New Hampshire.

Five days later she continued on to Boston, Mass, arriving 31 October. She was decommissioned at the Boston Navy Yard on 9 November 1945. Marlin was sold 29 March 1946 to the Boston Metals Company of Baltimore, Maryland, for scrapping.

Marlin is the submarine prominently featured as the fictional Corsair in the 1943 movie Crash Dive, filmed at Submarine Base New London. Her sail at the time of the movie resembled Mackerel'''s; the forward portion was later cut back for a 20 mm Oerlikon gun platform.

References

 Alden, John D., Commander (USN, Ret). The Fleet Submarine in the U.S. Navy: A Design and Construction History. Annapolis: Naval Institute Press, 1979. .
 Lenton, H. T. American Submarines (Navies of the Second World War) (Doubleday, 1973), .
 Silverstone, Paul H., U.S. Warships of World War II (Ian Allan, 1965), .
 Gardiner, Robert and Chesneau, Roger, Conway's All the World's Fighting Ships 1922–1946'', Conway Maritime Press, 1980. .

External links

 https://web.archive.org/web/20140322093118/http://www.fleetsubmarine.com/sublist.html
 Navsource.org USS Marlin photo page
 DiGiulian, Tony Navweaps.com later 3"/50 caliber gun

 

Mackerel-class submarines
World War II submarines of the United States
Ships built in Kittery, Maine
1941 ships
Maritime incidents in July 1945